"So Much Love" is a song written by Gerry Goffin and Carole King. It was first recorded by Ben E King in 1966. In 1967 it was covered by  The Hour Glass and in 1969 by Dusty Springfield.

As a R&B/Soul/Pop song it was also covered by Blood, Sweat & Tears, Eric Burdon,  Darlene Love, David Garrick, Steve Alaimo, Maurice & Mac, Percy Sledge, Tony Blackburn and others.

In 2000 George Nooks performed it in a reggae version.

1967 songs
1980 songs
Dusty Springfield songs
Eric Burdon songs
Songs written by Carole King
Songs with lyrics by Gerry Goffin